Raid on Banu Thalabah refers to a series of raids on Banu Thalabah. It may refer to:

First Raid on Banu Thalabah, August, 627 AD in 4th month of 6AH 
Second Raid on Banu Thalabah, August, 627 AD in 4th month of 6AH
Third Raid on Banu Thalabah, September, 627 AD, 6th month of 6AH 

627
Campaigns ordered by Muhammad